Pure Earth is a New York City-based international not-for-profit organization founded in 1999 that works to identify, clean up, and solve pollution problems in low- and middle-income countries, where high concentrations of toxic pollution have devastating health impacts, especially on children. These communities suffer disproportionately from pollution-related diseases. Pure Earth remains the only significant organization of its kind working to solve pollution on a global scale.

Pure Earth's work focuses on two key pollutants: lead and mercury.

The Global Lead Program works on reducing lead poisoning from three key sources poisoning millions of children in low- and middle-income countries: the unsafe and informal recycling of used lead-acid (car) batteries; lead-glazed pottery, and contaminated spices.  

The Global Mercury Program works to reduce mercury from artisanal and small scale gold mining communities around the world by training miners to go mercury free, and helping miners in the Amazon rainforest restore land damaged by mining.

Pure Earth is known for the Toxic Sites Identification Program, a global movement to find and clean up the world’s most toxic sites. The program has trained over 500 pollution investigators and 90 government representatives worldwide, who have identified and mapped over 5000 toxic hotspots in communities around the world. The data they collect has built an “unprecedented public database of toxic sites” that helps local communities and governments plan clean up to protect residents.

Pure Earth is also known for initiating the Global Alliance on Health and Pollution, which in turn led to the formation of The Lancet Commission on pollution and health and the publication of the groundbreaking report from the Lancet Commission on health and pollution which concludes that pollution is the largest environmental cause of death in the world today, killing three times more people than AIDS/HIV, tuberculosis and malaria combined, and 15 times more deaths and war and other forms of violence. 

In 2015, Pure Earth helped to successfully advocate for broadening the scope of toxic pollution addressed in the Sustainable Development Goals (SDGs).

In 2020, Pure Earth and UNICEF issued an urgent call to protect 800 million children poisoned by lead, following the publication of their joint report: The Toxic Truth: Children’s exposure to lead pollution undermines a generation of potential. The report revealed that lead poisoning is affecting children on a massive and previously unknown scale – one in three children globally have elevated blood lead levels, and nearly half of them live in South Asia.

Pure Earth has been recognized by Charity Navigator as one of the United States' top performing nonprofits.

Pure Earth was formerly known as the Blacksmith Institute, which was recognized for a series of World's Worst Pollution Problems reports that first brought attention to the global pollution problem.

Pollution: Largest Environmental Cause of Death In The World Today 
In 2017, Pure Earth President Richard Fuller and Dr. Philip Landrigan, serving as co-chairs of the Lancet Commission on Pollution and Health, issued an open letter, and presided over the release of the landmark report from the Commission, which confirmed that pollution is the largest environmental cause of disease and premature death in the world today—causing 3x more deaths than HIV/AIDS, TB and malaria combined, and 15x more deaths than wars and all forms of violence.

The report's findings made headlines around the world. The Washington Post's editorial concluded that "The Lancet study should remind leaders in the United States and elsewhere that, though there are costs associated with restricting pollution, countries also incur costs by failing to do so." Fareed Zakaria issued a passionate commentary about pollution's deadly global impact.

The Lancet Commission on Pollution and Health is an initiative of The Lancet, the Global Alliance on Health and Pollution (for which Pure Earth serves as Secretariat), and the Icahn School of Medicine at Mount Sinai, with additional coordination and input from United Nations Environment, United Nations Industrial Development Organization (UNIDO), and the World Bank.

Toxic Sites Identification Program 
Pure Earth's Toxic Site Identification Program (TSIP) works to identify and screen contaminated sites in low- and middle-income countries where public health is at risk. Pure Earth has trained more than 400 toxic sites investigators around the world to find, map and assess polluted sites that pose health risks in their communities. To date, TSIP investigators have identified more than 3,100 sites in over 50 countries. These sites alone represent a potential health risk to more than 80 million poor people.

The data collected by TSIP investigators is entered into Pure Earth's database of polluted sites, the largest database of its kind. This information is made accessible to governments so that they can formulate plans to prioritize action on pollution that poses the most risk to populations.

The public can view the data at pollution.org

The Global Alliance on Health and Pollution
In July 2012, Pure Earth convened a third meeting of world leaders and experts on pollution at the Rockefeller Foundation's Bellagio Center in Italy. The Global Alliance on Health and Pollution (GAPH) was formed that year by Pure Earth, the World Bank, UNEP, UNDP, UNIDO, Asian Development Bank, the European Commission, Ministries of Environment and Health of many low- and middle-income countries to address pollution and health at scale. Blacksmith serves as Secretariat for the GAHP. Blacksmith began coordinating an international effort to create a global alliance in 2008. The effort was formerly called the Health and Pollution Fund.

Journal Of Health and Pollution 
Published by Pure Earth, the Journal of Health and Pollution (JH&P) is a quarterly on-line journal of peer reviewed research and news. JH&P is grant funded by the World Bank and the European Union. There are no charges to readers or authors. JH&P aims to facilitate discussion of toxic pollution, impacts to human health and strategies for site remediation. The journal focuses on work by researchers from or about under-represented low- and middle-income countries.

Key projects 
 RMS Rapid Market Screenings:- In 2021, Pure Earth launched an ambitious project to analyze the lead (Pb) content in thousands of products and food samples in markets across 25 low- and middle-income countries. The Rapid Market Screening (RMS) project is the first analysis of its kind that we are aware of. The RMS project follows the 2020 publication of The Toxic Truth report by Pure Earth and UNICEF, which revealed for the first time that an estimated 800 million children, or 1 in 3, have blood lead levels indicative of lead poisoning (>5 μg/dl). 
 Mexico: Barro Aprobado - Research shows nearly half the children in Mexico are impacted by lead poisoning from traditional pottery glazed with lead that is used in many homes and restaurants in Mexico. The Barro Aprobado project is raising public awareness about the dangers of leaded pottery, and promoting the use and production of lead-free pottery.
 Azerbaijan: Cleanup of infamous pesticide site in Salyan.
 Zambia: Lead remediation in Kabwe, sometimes called the world's most toxic town.
 Mongolia: Training artisanal miners to go mercury free. Over 1000 miners have been trained to date.
 Ukraine – Cleanup of former Soviet arms site, filled with highly toxin chemicals and explosives, as chronicled in Bloomberg Businessweek 
 Nigeria: In 2011, Pure Earth received a Green Star Award for emergency work during the Nigeria lead poisoning crisis in Zamfara.
 Armenia: Cleanup of 10th century historical site.

Other highlights 
In October 2022, Pure Earth’s Founder and President Richard Fuller was included in the #FuturePerfect50 list from Vox, recognizing “The scientists, thinkers, scholars, writers, and activists building a more perfect future.” 

In 2010, Pure Earth's impact was charted in a profile of its founder Richard Fuller in Time's "Power of One" column.

2015 saw the release of the book The Brown Agenda.

In 2019, Pure Earth released the report Pollution Knows No Borders: How the Pollution Crisis in Low- and Middle-Income Countries Affects Everyone’s Health, and What We Can Do to Address It.

Name change 
Pure Earth was founded as the Blacksmith Institute in 1999.

In 2014, Blacksmith launched a new initiative – Blacksmith Institute for a Pure Earth – with English actor Dev Patel as celebrity ambassador. Patel worked closely with Blacksmith to suggest the new name, and will help support efforts to raise awareness about toxic pollution, an issue he says he first grew aware of after filming in India. Blacksmith will slowly transition to a new name – Pure Earth – with the aim of broadening awareness of global toxic pollution issues to the general public.

World's Worst Polluted Places reports
For over a decade, Pure Earth's World’s Worst Pollution Problems reports identified and drew attention to the worst, and most dangerously polluted places on the planet, while documenting and quantifying the startling health and environmental impacts of this neglected problem. The series of reports succeeded in raising global awareness about the extent and impacts of toxic pollution in low- and middle-income countries. All reports are archived at http://worstpolluted.org

2016 report: The Toxics Beneath Our Feet (Top Polluting Industries) 
 Used Lead Acid Battery (ULAB) Recycling
 Mining and Ore Processing
 Lead Smelters
 Tanneries
 Artisanal Small-scale Gold Mining (ASGM)
 Industrial Dumpsites
 Industrial Estates
 Chemical Manufacturing
 Product Manufacturing
 Dye Industry

2015 report: Top Six Toxic Threats
 Lead
 Radionuclides
 Mercury
 Chromium
 Pesticides
 Cadmium

2014 report: Top Ten Countries Turning The Corner on Toxic Pollution
(Not ranked, listed by region.)
 Ghana, Agbogbloshie
 Senegal, Thiaroye Sur Mer
 Peru
 Uruguay, Montevideo
 Mexico, Mexico City
 Indonesia, Cinangka
 Philippines, Marilao, Meycauayan and Obando River System
 Vietnam, Dong Mai
 Former Soviet Union
 Kyrgyzstan, Mailuu-Suu
 Also China, India and Madagascar

2013 report: Top Ten Toxic Threats in 2013: Cleanup, Progress, and Ongoing Challenges
The World's Worst Polluted Places in 2013 (unranked):
 Agbogbloshie, Ghana
 Chernobyl*, Ukraine
 Citarum River, Indonesia
 Dzerzhinsk, Russia*
 Hazaribagh Thana, Bangladesh
 Kabwe*, Zambia
 Kalimantan, Indonesia
 Matanza River, Argentina
 Niger River Delta, Nigeria
 Norilsk*, Russia

(*included in the original 2006 or 2007 lists)

2012 report: The Top Ten Sources by Global Burden of Disease
 Battery recycling
 Lead smelting
 Mining and Ore processing
 Tanneries
 Industrial/Municipal Dumpsites
 Industrial estates
 Artisanal Gold mining
 Product manufacturing
 Chemical manufacturing
 Dye industry

2011 report: The Top Ten of the Toxic Twenty
Top Ten Worst Toxic Pollution Problems:
 Artisanal Gold Mining – Mercury
 Industrial Estates – Lead
 Agricultural Production- Pesticides
 Lead Smelting – Lead
 Tannery Operation – Chromium
 Mining and Ore Processing – Mercury
 Mining and Ore Processing – Lead
 Lead-Acid Battery Recycling – Lead
 Naturally Occurring Arsenic in Ground Water – Arsenic
 Pesticide Manufacturing and Storage – Pesticide

2010 report: Top Six Toxic Threats
The report identifies and quantifies the impacts of the most damaging toxic pollutants. The Top Six Toxic Threats are:
 Lead
 Mercury
 Chromium
 Arsenic
 Pesticides
 Radionuclides

2009 report: 12 Cases of Cleanup and Success
The report lists 10 programs, unranked, as examples of successful efforts to reduce the toll of pollution on human health. It also includes two initiatives with worldwide impact.
 Improving indoor air – Accra, Ghana
 Preventing mining pollution – Candelaria, Chile
 Lowering radioactivity – Chernobyl, Ukraine
 Cleaning urban air – Delhi, India
 Removing lead – Haina, Dominican Republic
 Recapturing mercury – Kalimantan, Indonesia
 Reducing lead – Rudnaya Pristan, Russia
 Removing DDT – Old Korogwe, Tanzania
 Restoring a waterway – Shanghai, China
 Removing arsenic – West Bengal, India
 Phasing out leaded gasoline – Worldwide
 Ending chemical weapons – Worldwide

2008 report: Top Ten World's Worst Pollution Problems
 Artisanal Gold Mining
 Contaminated Surface Water
 Indoor Air Pollution
 Industrial Mining Activities
 Groundwater Contamination
 Metals Smelting and Processing
 Radioactive Waste and Uranium Mining
 Untreated Sewage
 Urban Air Quality
 Used Lead Acid Battery Recycling

2006 and 2007 reports:  Top Ten World's Worst Polluted Places
As of September 2007, the Institute lists the following as the world's ten most polluted places (in alphabetical order by country):
 Sumqayit, Azerbaijan
 Linfen, China
 Tianying, China
 Sukinda, India
 Vapi, India (Update: Removed from list due to significant improvements)
 La Oroya, Peru
 Dzerzhinsk, Russia
 Norilsk, Russia
 Chernobyl, Ukraine
 Kabwe, Zambia

Also mentioned
 Godwin, Kenya
 Matanza, Argentina
 Hazaribagh Thana, Bangladesh
 DongYangHuaxi, China
 Lanzhou, China
 Urumqi, China
 Wanshan, China
 Haina, Dominican Republic
 Oriente, Ecuador
 Mahad Industrial Estate, India
 Ranipet, India
 Ust-Kamenogorsk, Kazakhstan
 Mailuu-Suu, Kyrgyzstan
 Mexico City, Mexico
 Huancavelica, Peru
 Meycauayan, Philippines
 Marilao, Philippines
 Bratsk, Russia
 Chita, Russia
 Magnitogorsk, Russia
 Rudnaya Pristan, Russia

References

External links
 Official website
 World's Worst Polluted Places Reports

Organizations established in 1999
Environmental organizations based in New York City
1999 establishments in New York (state)